Funny Ka, Pare Ko (lit. You are Funny, My Friend) is a Philippine comedy television series with a mixed sitcom and stand-up format aired on Cine Mo!, an exclusive channel of ABS-CBN TV Plus. It is the first local television program to be produced and aired on a digital TV-exclusive channel in the Philippines.

Premiered on April 3, 2016, the show is top billed by seasoned comedy actors Bayani Agbayani, Karla Estrada and Jayson Gainza, and It's Showtime's segment "Funny One" grand champion Ryan Rems and finalists Nonong Ballinan, No Direction and Crazy Duo. The show will be directed by Jon Red.

On its second season which it premiered July 3, 2016, Tommy Esguerra and Miho Nishida joined the sitcom. The second season ended last September 25, 2016.

After two seasons, the sitcom had its hiatus while the third season is worked out. The sitcom aired the best episodes of the first and second seasons respectively. The third season is expected to air starting January 8, 2017.

On its fifth season which it premiered on May 20, 2018, Carlo Mendoza, Dennis Padilla, Grae Fernandez, Kira Balinger, James Caraan, Pilipinas Got Talent 3rd Place Joven Olvido, and It's Showtime's segment "Funny One" season 2 grand champion Donna Cariaga joined the sitcom.

Cast

Main
 Bayani Agbayani as Boyet “Bigboy” Delyon
 Karla Estrada as Carlita Delyon
 Jayson Gainza as Dong Dong
 Dennis Padilla as Don Jovi
 Alora Sasam as Pags
 Nonong Ballinan as himself
 Alex Calleja as Kap Al
 Igi Boy Flores as Jay-Ar
 Donna Cariaga as herself
 Joven Olvido as Attorney Petma
 Carlo Mendoza as Niknok
 Grae Fernandez as himself
 Kira Balinger as Princess
 James Caraan as himself
 Erin Ocampo
 Juliana Parizcova Segovia

Former
Season 1
 Beverly Salviejo
 Manuel Chua
 Mar Lopez
 Ryan Rems
Season 2
 Miho Nishida
 Tommy Esguerra
 Chun-sa Jung
 Jesse James Ongtengco
Season 3
 No Direction (Bangkay)
 Iskoobi Duo (?)
Season 4
 Jobert Austria
 Lee Bruno
 Iskoobi Duo (Jules)
 No Direction (Steven) and (Sadam)
 Crazy Duo (Diego) and (Gedent)
 Ysabel Ortega
 Rhed Bustamante
 Wacky Kiray

References

2010s Philippine television series
2016 Philippine television series debuts
2018 Philippine television series endings
Philippine comedy television series
Philippine television sitcoms
Filipino-language television shows